Kate Champion is an Australian choreographer and artistic director.

Biography
Champion is the incoming artistic director of Black Swan State Theatre Company. She was the founding artistic director/CEO of Force Majeure (2002–2015), an influential dance theatre company based in Sydney.

Champion has worked in theatre, dance, film, circus, opera and musical theatre with arts companies and institutes including Belvoir, Sydney Theatre Company, State Theatre Company of South Australia, Performing Lines, The English National Opera, Opera Australia, The Hayes Theatre, Ensemble, NIDA, NICA and National Theatre of Parramatta. Champion choreographed the original stage version of Dirty Dancing (Australia, UK, US, Europe). She has created and performed two critically acclaimed solo shows, Face Value and About Face.

As artistic director of Force Majeure, Kate co-devised and directed Same, Same But Different, Already Elsewhere, Tenebrae, The Age I’m In, Not in a Million Years, and Nothing to Lose. Theatre directing credits include – Every Brilliant Thing, My Brilliant Career, Food, That Eye the Sky, A View From the Bridge, Fully Committed, Honour, Evie May and Perfect Stranger.
Kate has been awarded Helpmann, Green Room, MO and Australian Dance Awards. 
Champion was a professional dancer/performer working with companies such as DV8 Physical Theatre London, Australian Dance Theatre, Dance North, One Extra Co and Theatre of Image, before going on to create her own work and becoming a director.

Early career

Champion travelled to Munich at age 16 working with Iwanson Dance Company. Returning to Australia Champion was a member of One Extra Dance Company before moving to New York to study, and then returning to Australia becoming a foundation member of Dance North. In 1992 she travelled to London, where she spent time with Lloyd Newson's DV8 Physical Theatre, first as production assistant and then as a performer in Strange Fish, both the stage and BBC film versions. In 1998 she returned to DV8 as rehearsal director for a European tour of Enter Achilles and as a collaborator and performer in The Happiest Day of My Life.

In 1996, Champion was awarded the Robert Helpmann Scholarship for Choreographic Excellence enabling her to create her first solo work Face Value which was awarded a 1998 Green Room Award and a MO Award. In 2001 she created a second solo show About Face.

In 1997 Champion begin collaborating with theatre director Neil Armfield and choreographed Cloudstreet, and directed and devised Under the Influence.

Champion and Lloyd Newson's DV8 Physical Theatre worked together in creating a devised show for the Sydney Olympic Arts festival "The Cost of Living"

Force Majeure

As artistic director of Force Majeure, Champion devised and directed:

 Same, same, But Different – Sydney Festival, Brisbane Festival, Melbourne Festival (2002)
 Already Elsewhere – Sydney Festival (2005), Biennale de la Danse, Lyon (2006)
 The Age I'm In– Sydney Festival, Adelaide Festival (2008), Dublin Theatre Festival, Seoul Performing Arts Festival, Montreal Place des Arts (2009), national tour (2010)
 Not in a Million Years – Carriageworks (2010), Dance Massive Festival (2011)
 Never Did Me Any Harm – a coproduction with Sydney Theatre Company, Sydney Festival, Adelaide Festival, Melbourne Festival (2012), national tour (2016)
 Food – a coproduction with Belvoir (2012), metropolitan tour (2013), national tour (2014)
 Nothing to Lose – Sydney Festival, Malthouse Theatre (2015)

Other work

In 2004 Champion choreographed the world premiere of Dirty Dancing, the stage show based on the popular film. Her choreography has been included in the European, West-End, North American, South African and Asian versions of this box-office-record-holding production.

In 2010 she choreographed Opera Australia's Bliss, which also toured to the Edinburgh Festival, and Spring Awakening  for Sydney Theatre Company.

Continuing her collaborative relationship with Neil Armfield, Champion took on the role of associate director of Opera Australia's 2013 production (and 2016 remount) of Wagner's Ring Cycle, directed by Armfield.

In 2016 she directed Swallow, written by Stef Smith – the inaugural production of National Theatre of Parramatta.
In 2018 Champion directed That Eye the Sky, adapted from the novel by Tim Winton for State Theatre Company of South Australia, and the world premiere of the musical Evie May for Hayes Theatre. 2019 productions included Every Brilliant Thing for Belvoir Theatre, Meat Eaters and Perfect Strangers for NIDA, A View From the Bridge for State Theatre Company of Australia and Fully Committed and Honour for Ensemble Theatre.

Champion choreographed the movement sequences in the film Somersault (starring Abbie Cornish and Sam Worthington), and most recently RED.

In 2022, Champion was appointed artistic director of Black Swan State Theatre Company.

Awards

Australian Dance Awards
The Australian Dance Awards. 
 (wins only)
|-
| 2005
| Kate Champion – Already Elsewhere
| Outstanding Performance by a Company
| 
|-
| 2009
| Kate Champion – The Age I'm In 
| Outstanding Performance by a Company
| 
|-

Helpmann Award
The Helpmann Awards.
 (wins only)
|-
|rowspan="2"|  2002n
| Kate Champion – About Face
| Best Female Dance
| 
|-
| Kate Champion – Same, Same But Different
| Best Visual or Physical Theatre Production
| 
|-
| 2011
| Kate Champion – Not in a Million Years
| Best Visual or Physical Theatre Production
| 
|-

Mo Awards
The Australian Entertainment Mo Awards (commonly known informally as the Mo Awards), were annual Australian entertainment industry awards. They recognise achievements in live entertainment in Australia from 1975 to 2016.
 (wins only)
|-
| 1998
| Kate Champion
| Female Dance Performance of the Year
| 
|-

Other Awards
 Nothing to Lose – 2016 FBi Radio SMAC Award for Best on Stage
 Face Value – 1998 Greenroom Award for Best Female Dancer,

References

External links
 
 Champion is represented by HLA management. 
 Force Majeure
 RealTime TV interview on the set of Never Did Me Any Harm 
 National Library of Australia – Champion, Kate (1961–) – People and organisations
 Celebrating 40 years of Sydney Festival – Sydney Festival
 "The Evolution of Dance Theatre", by Jo Litson
 Bodies of Thought, by Dr Erin Brannigan
 ABC Radio, Sunday Brunch

Australian female dancers
Australian directors
Australian choreographers
Contemporary dancers
Helpmann Award winners
Living people
1961 births